The 1987 POMIS Cup is the first championship, starting group matches on 9 January 1987 onwards at Rasmee Dhandu Stadium, Malé, Maldives.

Teams
The top three teams of 1986 Dhivehi League and two invited foreign clubs.

Teams and Nation
Note: Table lists clubs in alphabetical order.

Final

References
 RSSSF POMIS CUP 1987

1987
1987 in Asian football
1987 in Maldivian football
1987 in Sri Lankan sport